Wisch is a former municipality in the Dutch province of Gelderland. The municipality was created in 1818, in a merger of Terborg and Varsseveld, and existed until 2005, when it became a part of the new municipality of Oude IJsselstreek.

Besides the villages of Terborg and Varsseveld, the municipality also covered the villages and hamlets Bontebrug, Heelweg-Oost, Heelweg-West, Silvolde, Sinderen, and Westendorp.

References

Municipalities of the Netherlands disestablished in 2005
Populated places in Gelderland
Former municipalities of Gelderland
Oude IJsselstreek